The Rapture is the eleventh and final studio album by English alternative rock band Siouxsie and the Banshees. The songs with cello arrangements, including the title track as well as "Fall from Grace" and "Not Forgotten", were produced by the band on their own in 1993. John Cale later produced the remaining songs in mid-1994.

Recording and release
After composing songs in Siouxsie and Budgie's house near Toulouse, France, in March and April 1993, the band went to Léon near Biarritz. They produced the first part of the album at Studio du Manoir in May. At the beginning of 1994, they recorded the final songs in London, this time with producer and former Velvet Underground member John Cale, who had previously produced albums that the band liked such as Patti Smith's Horses and the first Modern Lovers album. Cale also mixed one track, "Fall from Grace", from the previous recording session.

In the UK, Polydor only released the album on both CD and cassette, whereas in the US, Geffen also released it on vinyl LP.

This album was remastered for CD in 2014 with three bonus tracks, including a previously unreleased song called "FGM", and "New Skin", a song recorded for the Showgirls soundtrack of the Paul Verhoeven film of the same name. "New Skin" has got a different mix and is longer than on the original Showgirls album. From then and on all further reissues, "Stargazer" has got a different mix: the Mark Saunders mix was included instead of the original mix initially made by the band.

A double vinyl reissue of the album, half-speed mastered from the original ¼” tapes by Miles Showell at Abbey Road Studios, was released in December 2018.

Critical reception

Melody Maker wrote: "The Rapture is a fascinating, transcontinental journey through danger and exotica". Describing the arrangements, they added, "it's a vivid cornucopia of lush instrumentation, mandolins vying with cellos and bells, sweeping strings describing starlit oceans and sirens calling from jagged rocks, and attics that hide secret worlds". Steve Malins of Vox also liked the album. He said, "The title-track is a sublime melodrama recalling the experimentation of Peepshow and 1982's Kiss in the Dreamhouse",  before concluding with this sentence, "The Rapture represents an intelligent twist on familiar Banshees obsessions". Liz Buckley of Sun Zoom Spark also praised it, writing, "How is a band that first formed almost two decades ago able to remain both vital and celebrated? Answer: Metamorphosis". Buckley also declared that "the album is able to excite the hairs on the back of your neck". Select gave it a rating of four out of five, hailing the band as "purveyors of scary pop par excellence". Matt Hall noted the ability of the group for "trotting out jolly tunes about mental breakdown, love bordering on obsession and severely dislocated relationships." The reviewer characterised The Rapture as a "fine little Russian doll of a record", and said, "Under the keyboard lines, swelling strings and OTT percussion, at the centre of every song is a nugget of disquiet that keeps you listening again and again."

Writing in the 2004 edition of The Rolling Stone Album Guide, Mark Coleman and Mac Randall described The Rapture as "a lackluster affair".

Andrew Weatherall included the track "The Double Life" in a two-hour mix he did and presented for BBC Radio 6 in April 2011.

Track listing
All tracks produced by Siouxsie and the Banshees except tracks 1-2 and 7-8-9 produced by John Cale. Track 4 produced by Siouxsie and the Banshees and mixed by John Cale.

All music composed by Siouxsie and the Banshees, except bonus tracks "FGM" by Siouxsie/Jon Klein and "New Skin" by Siouxsie.

Personnel
Siouxsie and the Banshees
Siouxsie Sioux - vocals
Steven Severin - electric bass
Budgie - drums and percussion
Martin McCarrick - cello, keyboards and accordion
Jon Klein – guitars
Additional personnel
Renaud Pion - woodwind
John Cale - producer and mixer
Martin Brass - engineer
Charlie Gray - engineer
Knox Chandler - guitar on "New Skin"
Gary Barnacle, Peter Thoms, Luke Tunney and John Thirkell [uncredited] - brass section on "New Skin"

Charts

References 

Siouxsie and the Banshees albums
1995 albums
Albums produced by John Cale
Polydor Records albums
Geffen Records albums